Samuel Cuningham Strahan (25 December 1944 – 21 December 2019) was a New Zealand rugby union player. He represented  Manawatu at a provincial level, and represented New Zealand in the national team, the All Blacks.

Rugby career
A lock, Strahan represented Manawatu at a provincial level for 12 seasons, and the All Blacks between 1967 and 1973. He played 45 matches for the All Blacks including 17 internationals.

Later life
He served as president of the Manawatu Rugby Union from 2003 to 2006.

Strahan died at his home in Kiwitea, northeast of Feilding, on 21 December 2019.

References

1944 births
2019 deaths
Rugby union players from Palmerston North
People educated at Whanganui Collegiate School
New Zealand rugby union players
New Zealand international rugby union players
Manawatu rugby union players
Rugby union locks
New Zealand sports executives and administrators